Antoine Devon Walker (born August 12, 1976) is an American former professional basketball player. He was drafted with the sixth overall pick in the 1996 NBA draft out of the University of Kentucky and played in the NBA from 1996 to 2008. Walker played for the Boston Celtics, Dallas Mavericks, Atlanta Hawks, Miami Heat, Minnesota Timberwolves, the BSN's Mets de Guaynabo and the NBA D-League's Idaho Stampede before retiring from basketball in 2012. Walker, a three-time NBA All-Star, won an NCAA championship with Kentucky in 1996 and an NBA championship with the Heat in 2006.

Pre-NBA career
Walker attended Mount Carmel High School, in Chicago, where he played with future NFL quarterback Donovan McNabb and attained all-state status as a senior, earning a full scholarship to play for Rick Pitino at the University of Kentucky. He was a starting forward on the Wildcats' 1996 NCAA Men's Division I Basketball Championship Game-winning team. As a freshman at Kentucky he was named SEC Tournament MVP. In his sophomore year, Walker was named All-SEC First, All-SEC Tournament and to the All-NCAA Regional Teams.

Professional career

Boston Celtics (1996–2003) 
After Walker's sophomore season, he declared for the 1996 NBA draft and was picked sixth overall by the Boston Celtics. In the 1996–1997 season, Walker made the All-Rookie First Team and led the team in scoring (17.5 ppg) and rebounding (9.0), as the team had its worst season in franchise history, 15–67. The following season, Pitino was reunited with Walker as the new coach of the Celtics and he made the All-Star team as a reserve while averaging 22.4 ppg and 10.2 rpg. He also scored a career-high 49 points in a loss against the Washington Wizards. Walker's success led to his appearance on the cover of NBA Live 99.

In the '98 draft, the Celtics had the 10th pick and chose swing man Paul Pierce. The next few years, Pierce and Walker were a talented duo for the Celtics. In the 2001–2002 season, Walker had his best overall season by helping lead the Celtics to a 49–33 record and their first playoff berth in seven years. He was second on his team in scoring (22.0), first in rebounds (9), and first in assists, (5.0). Pierce and Walker took the team to the Eastern Conference finals, where they fell to the New Jersey Nets in six games. The next season, Walker made his third All-Star team.

On February 20, 2002, former Kentucky teammate Tony Delk was traded to the Celtics, reuniting Walker with him.

Dallas Mavericks (2003–2004) 
Just 10 days before the start of the 2003–04 season, Walker was traded with Delk to the Dallas Mavericks for Raef LaFrentz, Chris Mills, and Jiří Welsch. Walker was used in a relatively limited capacity on his new team due to the number of high-caliber players populating the Mavericks' roster. Included on that team was Antawn Jamison, newly acquired from the Golden State Warriors.

Atlanta Hawks (2004–2005) 
On August 8, 2004, Walker and Delk were traded again, this time to the Atlanta Hawks for Jason Terry, longtime Hawk Alan Henderson and a draft pick.

Return to Boston (2005)
On February 24, 2005, Walker was traded back to the Celtics in a deal that sent Gary Payton, Tom Gugliotta, Michael Stewart, and a first-round draft pick to the Hawks. (Payton was released by the Hawks and re-signed with Boston for the remainder of the season). Walker started all 24 remaining games for the Celtics, averaging 16.3 points and 8.3 rebounds a game as the Celtics advanced to the playoffs before losing to the Indiana Pacers in a 7-game first round series. For his second stint with the Celtics, Walker briefly chose to wear the uniform number 88, as his trademark 8 jersey was being worn by rookie Al Jefferson. Jefferson would switch to number 7 after 2 games.

Miami Heat (2005–2007) 

On August 2, 2005, Walker was involved in a five-team, 13-player deal (the largest trade in NBA history) that sent him from the Celtics to the Miami Heat. The Celtics received Curtis Borchardt, Qyntel Woods, the draft rights of Albert Miralles, and draft picks in the deal. The move reunited Walker with Celtics teammate Gary Payton.

The Heat played Walker mostly off the bench, and he rotated between both forward positions. Though he struggled early to adjust to this role, by the end of the season he was a force for the Heat, finishing the season with averages of 12.2 points and 5.1 rebounds a game as the team's main scorer off the bench. Walker also led the team in overall 3-point shots made for the season, and increased his 3-point, free throw and overall shooting percentages.

In the playoffs his production would increase, as he would be the third leading scorer for the team while making crucial three-point baskets and posting 20 points in four different playoff games including 23 against the New Jersey Nets in the closing game of the conference semifinals. Miami advanced to the NBA Finals and faced the Dallas Mavericks, with Walker posting 13.8 points per game in the series as the Heat won the NBA championship in 6 games. In the title clinching sixth game in Dallas, Walker contributed 14 points and 11 rebounds. Walker's production dipped in the 2006–2007 season as he averaged 8.5 points a game and 4.3 rebounds. The Heat failed to repeat as champions following a first round loss to the Chicago Bulls.

Minnesota Timberwolves (2007–2008) 
On October 24, 2007, Walker was traded to the Minnesota Timberwolves along with Michael Doleac, Wayne Simien, a first-round draft pick and cash considerations in exchange for Ricky Davis and Mark Blount.

On June 27, 2008, Walker was dealt to the Memphis Grizzlies along with Marko Jarić, Greg Buckner, and the rights to O. J. Mayo, for Mike Miller, Brian Cardinal, Jason Collins, and the rights to Kevin Love. After appearing in just two preseason games and remaining inactive throughout the opening months of the regular season, he was waived by the Grizzlies on December 19, 2008.

Mets de Guaynabo (2010) 
In February 2010, Walker signed with the Guaynabo Mets along with former Chicago Bulls player Marcus Fizer. Walker was released on April 1, 2010.

Idaho Stampede (2010–2012) 
On May 6, 2010, ESPN reported that Walker was trying to return to the NBA. On December 7, 2010, Walker was acquired by Idaho Stampede of the NBA Development League. It was reported in April 2012 that Walker had announced his retirement after two years with the Stampede.

Personal life

Walker was previously engaged to reality star Evelyn Lozada of Basketball Wives from 1998 until 2008. Walker was raised and born on the Chicago's south-side and attended Mount Carmel high school.

Legal issues
In 1997, alongside Walker's roommate as well as NBA players Ron Mercer and Chauncey Billups, Walker was identified in a lawsuit of a woman who said she was raped in his home. Walker denied participation in the sexual assault, but was accused of walking through the room while it took place. Walker filed a counter-complaint against Mercer and Billups, but those records are sealed. Mercer and Billups settled the case out of court.

On January 5, 2009, Walker was arrested for driving under the influence in Miami Beach, Florida.

On July 15, 2009, Walker was charged with three felony counts of writing bad checks related to gambling debts he had incurred at three Las Vegas casinos. Walker was arrested on July 15 at Harrah's Casino in South Lake Tahoe, Nevada. The charges stemmed from over $800,000 in gambling debts. Walker was in South Lake Tahoe to play in the American Century Celebrity Golf Classic the following day.

On June 30, 2010, Walker entered a plea of not guilty on felony bad check charges stemming from his failure to pay $770,000 in gambling losses to Caesars Palace and two other casinos in Las Vegas, according to the Las Vegas Review Journal. A year later, he pleaded guilty to one felony count of passing a bad check. Under the plea agreement, he did not face a prison term, and was put on probation and worked towards repaying the debt.

Victim of Robberies
In July 2000, Walker and former University of Kentucky teammate Nazr Mohammed were robbed outside a South Side Chicago restaurant. On July 9, 2007, Walker and another individual were robbed at gunpoint by two offenders in his own house. The assailants made off with close to $200,000 worth of merchandise, including Walker's Mercedes. His car was later recovered having been stripped of its expensive aftermarket wheels and stereo system. Four men were charged in this robbery and two of them were also linked to the similar robbery of fellow NBA player, Eddy Curry.

Bankruptcy
On May 18, 2010, Walker filed for Chapter 7 bankruptcy protection in the Southern District of Florida (Miami) as case number 10-23558 with total assets of $4.3 million and debts of $12.7 million. The filing listed four pieces of real estate including a $2.3 million Miami home that was underwater with a mortgage of $3.6 million, and three other properties in Chicago, one listed for $1.4 million. Nazr Mohammed paid half the fee of Walker's bankruptcy attorney. Walker's championship ring had to be sold off. In August 2013, Walker announced that he was debt-free. Between 1996 and 2009, Walker earned more than $108 million from NBA salaries.

Broadcasting career
Walker was a basketball analyst on 120 Sports. Walker was also hired by SEC Network as a basketball analyst.

NBA career statistics

Regular season

|-
| align="left" | 1996–97
| align="left" | Boston
| 82 || 68 || 36.2 || .425 || .327 || .631 || 9.0 || 3.2 || 1.3 || .6 || 17.5
|-
| align="left" | 1997–98
| align="left" | Boston
| 82 || 82 || 39.9 || .423 || .312 || .645 || 10.2 || 3.3 || 1.7 || .7 || 22.4
|-
| align="left" | 1998–99
| align="left" | Boston
| 42 || 41 || 36.9 || .412 || .369 || .559 || 8.5 || 3.1 || 1.5 || .7 || 18.7
|-
| align="left" | 1999–00
| align="left" | Boston
| 82 || 82 || 36.6 || .430 || .256 || .699 || 8.0 || 3.7 || 1.4 || .4 || 20.5
|-
| align="left" | 2000–01
| align="left" | Boston
| 81 || 81 || 41.9 || .413 || .367 || .716 || 8.9 || 5.5 || 1.7 || .6 || 23.4
|-
| align="left" | 2001–02
| align="left" | Boston
| 81 || 81 || 42.0 || .394 || .344 || .741 || 8.8 || 5.0 || 1.5 || .5 || 22.1
|-
| align="left" | 2002–03
| align="left" | Boston
| 78 || 78 || 41.5 || .388 || .323 || .615 || 7.2 || 4.8 || 1.5 || .4 || 20.1
|-
| align="left" | 2003–04
| align="left" | Dallas
| 82 || 82 || 34.6 || .428 || .269 || .554 || 8.3 || 4.5 || .8 || .8 || 14.0
|-
| align="left" | 2004–05
| align="left" | Atlanta
| 53 || 53 || 40.2 || .415 || .317 || .534 || 9.4 || 3.7 || 1.2 || .6 || 20.4
|-
| align="left" | 2004–05
| align="left" | Boston
| 24 || 24 || 34.5 || .442 || .342 || .557 || 8.3 || 3.0 || 1.0 || 1.1 || 16.3
|-
| style="text-align:left;background:#afe6ba;" | 2005–06†
| align="left" | Miami
| 82 || 19 || 26.8 || .435 || .358 || .628 || 5.1 || 2.0 || .6 || .4 || 12.2
|-
| align="left" | 2006–07
| align="left" | Miami
| 78 || 15 || 23.3 || .397 || .275 || .438 || 4.3 || 1.7 || .6 || .2 || 8.5
|-
| align="left" | 2007–08
| align="left" | Minnesota
| 46 || 1 || 19.4 || .363 || .324 || .530 || 3.7 || 1.0 || .7 || .2 || 8.0
|- class="sortbottom"
| style="text-align:center;" colspan="2"| Career
| 893 || 707 || 35.3 || .414 || .325 || .633 || 7.7 || 3.5 || 1.2 || .5 || 17.5
|- class="sortbottom"
| style="text-align:center;" colspan="2"| All-Star
| 3 || 1 || 13.3 || .350 || .300 || .500 || 2.0 || 1.3 || .7 || .0 || 6.0

Playoffs

|-
| align="left" | 2002
| align="left" | Boston
| 16 || 16 || 43.9 || .411 || .385 || .781 || 8.6 || 3.3 || 1.5 || .4 || 22.1
|-
| align="left" | 2003
| align="left" | Boston
| 10 || 10 || 44.0 || .415 || .356 || .500 || 8.7 || 4.3 || 1.7 || .4 || 17.3
|-
| align="left" | 2004
| align="left" | Dallas
| 5 || 5 || 28.0 || .361 || .100 || .571 || 10.0 || 2.4 || 1.2 || .6 || 9.8
|-
| align="left" | 2005
| align="left" | Boston
| 6 || 6 || 37.3 || .413 || .368 || .636 || 7.3 || 2.3 || 1.2 || 1.0 || 16.7
|-
| style="text-align:left;background:#afe6ba;" | 2006†
| align="left" | Miami
| 23 || 23 || 37.5 || .403 || .324 || .574 || 5.6 || 2.4 || 1.0 || .3 || 13.3
|-
| align="left" | 2007
| align="left" | Miami
| 4 || 0 || 23.0 || .405 || .500 || .818 || 2.3 || 1.5 || .5 || .3 || 11.8
|- class="sortbottom"
| style="text-align:center;" colspan="2"| Career
| 64 || 60 || 38.5 || .406 || .352 || .663 || 7.1 || 2.9 || 1.2 || .4 || 16.1

See also
 List of National Basketball Association career 3-point scoring leaders
 List of National Basketball Association career turnovers leaders

References

External links
 
 Antoine Walker Bankruptcy Documents

1976 births
Living people
African-American basketball players
Atlanta Hawks players
Boston Celtics draft picks
Boston Celtics players
Dallas Mavericks players
Idaho Stampede players
Kentucky Wildcats men's basketball players
McDonald's High School All-Americans
Miami Heat players
Minnesota Timberwolves players
National Basketball Association All-Stars
Parade High School All-Americans (boys' basketball)
Power forwards (basketball)
American men's basketball players
Basketball players from Chicago
21st-century African-American sportspeople
20th-century African-American sportspeople